Moshe Levy or Moishe Levi, or variant, may refer to:

 Moshe Levi (1936–2008), 12th Chief of Staff of the Israel Defense Forces
 Moshe Levy (author) (born 1948), author and survivor of the Israeli destroyer Eilat
 Moshe Levy (athlete) (born 1952), Paralympic athlete
 Moshe Levy (chemist) (born 1927), Israeli professor of chemistry at the Weizmann Institute of Science in Rehovot, Israel
 Moshe Levy (soldier) (born 1946), Israeli half-track commander awarded the Medal of Valor
 Morris Levy (born Moishe Levy), U.S. jazz club entrepreneur

See also

 Moïse Lévy, Rabbinic leader in the Democratic Republic of the Congo
 Moses Levy (disambiguation), an alternate spelling of Moshe Levy
 Morris Levy (disambiguation), an anglicization of Moshe Levy

 Levy (disambiguation)
 Levi (disambiguation)